The 1996 Pittsburgh Pirates season was the 115th season of the franchise; the 110th in the National League. This was their 27th season at Three Rivers Stadium. The Pirates finished fifth and last in the National League Central with a record of 73–89.

Offseason
 December 28, 1995: Charlie Hayes was signed as a free agent by the Pirates.
 February 2, 1996: Dale Sveum was signed as a free agent by the Pirates.
 February 4, 1996: Danny Darwin was signed as a free agent by the Pirates.
 February 17, 1996: Zane Smith was signed as a free agent by the Pirates.

Regular season

Season standings

Game log

|- bgcolor="ccffcc"
| 1 || April 1 || @ Marlins || 4–0 || Wagner (1–0) || Brown || — || 41,815 || 1–0
|- bgcolor="ccffcc"
| 2 || April 2 || @ Marlins || 4–1 || Christiansen (1–0) || Pena || Miceli (1) || 20,243 || 2–0
|- bgcolor="ffbbbb"
| 3 || April 4 || @ Marlins || 2–6 || Leiter || Ericks (0–1) || — || 19,008 || 2–1
|- bgcolor="ccffcc"
| 4 || April 5 || @ Mets || 7–5 || Smith (1–0) || Mlicki || — || 16,088 || 3–1
|- bgcolor="ccffcc"
| 5 || April 6 || @ Mets || 5–0 || Darwin (1–0) || Clark || — || 20,756 || 4–1
|- bgcolor="ffbbbb"
| 6 || April 8 || Phillies || 3–6 || Fernandez || Neagle (0–1) || — || 41,416 || 4–2
|- bgcolor="ffbbbb"
| 7 || April 10 || Phillies || 6–7 || Grace || Christiansen (1–1) || Bottalico || 7,075 || 4–3
|- bgcolor="ffbbbb"
| 8 || April 11 || Expos || 5–6 (11) || Rojas || Cordova (0–1) || Veres || 8,084 || 4–4
|- bgcolor="ffbbbb"
| 9 || April 12 || Expos || 3–13 || Rueter || Darwin (1–1) || — || 13,087 || 4–5
|- bgcolor="ccffcc"
| 10 || April 13 || Expos || 9–3 || Wagner (2–0) || Fassero || — || 13,834 || 5–5
|- bgcolor="ccffcc"
| 11 || April 14 || Expos || 5–2 || Neagle (1–1) || Martinez || — || 12,797 || 6–5
|- bgcolor="ffbbbb"
| 12 || April 15 || @ Cardinals || 4–6 || Benes || Ericks (0–2) || Honeycutt || 18,731 || 6–6
|- bgcolor="ccffcc"
| 13 || April 16 || @ Cardinals || 13–3 || Smith (2–0) || Benes || Lieber (1) || 21,349 || 7–6
|- bgcolor="ffbbbb"
| 14 || April 17 || @ Cardinals || 1–6 || Osborne || Darwin (1–2) || — || 23,074 || 7–7
|- bgcolor="ccffcc"
| 15 || April 18 || @ Cardinals || 6–2 || Wagner (3–0) || Stottlemyre || — || 25,700 || 8–7
|- bgcolor="ffbbbb"
| 16 || April 19 || @ Expos || 1–2 || Manuel || Plesac (0–1) || — || 13,256 || 8–8
|- bgcolor="ffbbbb"
| 17 || April 20 || @ Expos || 2–11 || Martinez || Ericks (0–3) || — || 14,022 || 8–9
|- bgcolor="ffbbbb"
| 18 || April 21 || @ Expos || 4–9 || Veres || Christiansen (1–2) || — || 11,361 || 8–10
|- bgcolor="ccffcc"
| 19 || April 22 || @ Phillies || 9–3 || Darwin (2–2) || Mulholland || — || 17,604 || 9–10
|- bgcolor="ffbbbb"
| 20 || April 23 || @ Phillies || 2–6 || Springer || Wagner (3–1) || Ryan || 19,254 || 9–11
|- bgcolor="ccffcc"
| 21 || April 24 || Marlins || 6–3 || Neagle (2–1) || Rapp || — || 9,812 || 10–11
|- bgcolor="ffbbbb"
| 22 || April 25 || Marlins || 1–4 || Leiter || Hope (0–1) || Nen || 8,315 || 10–12
|- bgcolor="ccffcc"
| 23 || April 26 || Mets || 10–6 || Christiansen (2–2) || Isringhausen || — || 13,185 || 11–12
|- bgcolor="ffbbbb"
| 24 || April 27 || Mets || 4–7 || Mlicki || Miceli (0–1) || Franco || 16,698 || 11–13
|- bgcolor="ffbbbb"
| 25 || April 28 || Mets || 5–7 || Jones || Wagner (3–2) || Franco || 27,706 || 11–14
|- bgcolor="ccffcc"
| 26 || April 30 || @ Reds || 10–7 || Neagle (3–1) || Smiley || Cordova (1) || 16,243 || 12–14
|-

|- bgcolor="ccffcc"
| 27 || May 1 || @ Reds || 4–3 || Hope (1–1) || Burba || Plesac (1) || 18,197 || 13–14
|- bgcolor="ffbbbb"
| 28 || May 3 || Dodgers || 1–10 || Park || Darwin (2–3) || — || 18,268 || 13–15
|- bgcolor="ccffcc"
| 29 || May 4 || Dodgers || 7–2 || Wagner (4–2) || Candiotti || — || 20,321 || 14–15
|- bgcolor="ccffcc"
| 30 || May 5 || Dodgers || 4–2 || Neagle (4–1) || Valdez || Plesac (2) || 19,206 || 15–15
|- bgcolor="ffbbbb"
| 31 || May 6 || Dodgers || 4–8 || Nomo || Hope (1–2) || Radinsky || 9,415 || 15–16
|- bgcolor="ffbbbb"
| 32 || May 8 || Padres || 4–5 || Tewksbury || May (0–1) || Hoffman || — || 15–17
|- bgcolor="ccffcc"
| 33 || May 8 || Padres || 4–3 || Christiansen (3–2) || Sanders || Cordova (2) || 8,508 || 16–17
|- bgcolor="ffbbbb"
| 34 || May 9 || Padres || 1–7 || Ashby || Wagner (4–3) || — || 10,863 || 16–18
|- bgcolor="ffbbbb"
| 35 || May 10 || Giants || 4–5 (10) || DeLucia || Cordova (0–2) || Beck || 17,611 || 16–19
|- bgcolor="ffbbbb"
| 36 || May 11 || Giants || 7–12 || VanLandingham || Hope (1–3) || — || 16,591 || 16–20
|- bgcolor="ffbbbb"
| 37 || May 12 || Giants || 2–7 || Watson || Smith (2–1) || — || 17,132 || 16–21
|- bgcolor="ffbbbb"
| 38 || May 13 || @ Braves || 3–9 || Glavine || Darwin (2–4) || — || 28,583 || 16–22
|- bgcolor="ffbbbb"
| 39 || May 14 || @ Braves || 3–7 || Smoltz || Wagner (4–4) || — || 28,175 || 16–23
|- bgcolor="ccffcc"
| 40 || May 15 || @ Braves || 3–0 || Neagle (5–1) || Avery || — || 30,917 || 17–23
|- bgcolor="ffbbbb"
| 41 || May 17 || @ Astros || 2–4 || Reynolds || Lieber (0–1) || Jones || 22,882 || 17–24
|- bgcolor="ccffcc"
| 42 || May 18 || @ Astros || 2–1 (11) || Cordova (1–2) || Young || Plesac (3) || 21,010 || 18–24
|- bgcolor="ffbbbb"
| 43 || May 19 || @ Astros || 3–4 || Jones || Lieber (0–2) || — || 18,815 || 18–25
|- bgcolor="ffbbbb"
| 44 || May 20 || @ Rockies || 7–10 || Reynoso || Neagle (5–2) || — || 48,042 || 18–26
|- bgcolor="ffbbbb"
| 45 || May 21 || @ Rockies || 10–12 || Holmes || Christiansen (3–3) || Ruffin || 48,037 || 18–27
|- bgcolor="ffbbbb"
| 46 || May 22 || @ Rockies || 3–6 || Ritz || Smith (2–2) || Ruffin || 48,044 || 18–28
|- bgcolor="ffbbbb"
| 47 || May 24 || Braves || 3–5 || Smoltz || Darwin (2–5) || Wohlers || 20,238 || 18–29
|- bgcolor="ccffcc"
| 48 || May 25 || Braves || 6–2 || Neagle (6–2) || Avery || — || 29,273 || 19–29
|- bgcolor="ffbbbb"
| 49 || May 26 || Braves || 3–6 (13) || Wade || Miceli (0–2) || Bielecki || 33,085 || 19–30
|- bgcolor="ffbbbb"
| 50 || May 27 || Astros || 3–5 || Kile || Smith (2–3) || — || 8,906 || 19–31
|- bgcolor="ccffcc"
| 51 || May 28 || Astros || 6–5 || Miceli (1–2) || Swindell || Cordova (3) || 7,182 || 20–31
|- bgcolor="ffbbbb"
| 52 || May 29 || Astros || 4–7 || Morman || Darwin (2–6) || Jones || 11,679 || 20–32
|- bgcolor="ccffcc"
| 53 || May 31 || Rockies || 8–4 || Neagle (7–2) || Reynoso || Cordova (4) || 26,640 || 21–32
|-

|- bgcolor="ffbbbb"
| 54 || June 1 || Rockies || 0–2 || Ritz || Wagner (4–5) || Ruffin || 15,633 || 21–33
|- bgcolor="ccffcc"
| 55 || June 2 || Rockies || 5–2 || Smith (3–3) || Holmes || Cordova (5) || 26,745 || 22–33
|- bgcolor="ccffcc"
| 56 || June 3 || Rockies || 7–2 || Ruebel (1–0) || Farmer || — || 8,120 || 23–33
|- bgcolor="ccffcc"
| 57 || June 4 || @ Dodgers || 3–0 || Darwin (3–6) || Nomo || Cordova (6) || 29,576 || 24–33
|- bgcolor="ccffcc"
| 58 || June 5 || @ Dodgers || 7–3 || Wilkins (1–0) || Astacio || Cordova (7) || 32,161 || 25–33
|- bgcolor="ffbbbb"
| 59 || June 6 || @ Dodgers || 3–8 || Candiotti || Miceli (1–3) || — || 26,664 || 25–34
|- bgcolor="ccffcc"
| 60 || June 7 || @ Padres || 10–0 || Smith (4–3) || Bergman || — || 20,312 || 26–34
|- bgcolor="ccffcc"
| 61 || June 8 || @ Padres || 9–8 (14) || Cordova (2–2) || Blair || — || 41,378 || 27–34
|- bgcolor="ccffcc"
| 62 || June 9 || @ Padres || 6–0 || Darwin (4–6) || Tewksbury || — || 30,932 || 28–34
|- bgcolor="ccffcc"
| 63 || June 10 || @ Giants || 5–4 || Morel (1–0) || DeLucia || Cordova (8) || 10,026 || 29–34
|- bgcolor="ccffcc"
| 64 || June 11 || @ Giants || 7–2 || Neagle (8–2) || Fernandez || — || 11,530 || 30–34
|- bgcolor="ffbbbb"
| 65 || June 13 || Marlins || 3–4 || Perez || Cordova (2–3) || Nen || 15,083 || 30–35
|- bgcolor="ccffcc"
| 66 || June 14 || Marlins || 5–4 || Plesac (1–1) || Nen || — || 26,494 || 31–35
|- bgcolor="ccffcc"
| 67 || June 15 || Marlins || 12–8 || Darwin (5–6) || Rapp || — || 15,596 || 32–35
|- bgcolor="ffbbbb"
| 68 || June 16 || Marlins || 2–4 || Brown || Neagle (8–3) || Nen || 28,120 || 32–36
|- bgcolor="ffbbbb"
| 69 || June 17 || Mets || 6–7 (10) || Mlicki || Cordova (2–4) || Franco || 11,002 || 32–37
|- bgcolor="ccffcc"
| 70 || June 19 || Mets || 6–5 || Plesac (2–1) || Isringhausen || — || — || 33–37
|- bgcolor="ffbbbb"
| 71 || June 19 || Mets || 3–5 || Mlicki || Cordova (2–5) || Franco || 20,108 || 33–38
|- bgcolor="ffbbbb"
| 72 || June 21 || @ Marlins || 0–4 || Brown || Darwin (5–7) || — || 20,442 || 33–39
|- bgcolor="ccffcc"
| 73 || June 22 || @ Marlins || 4–1 (10) || Plesac (3–1) || Perez || — || 26,666 || 34–39
|- bgcolor="ccffcc"
| 74 || June 23 || @ Marlins || 5–3 || Lieber (1–2) || Rapp || Cordova (9) || 20,769 || 35–39
|- bgcolor="ffbbbb"
| 75 || June 24 || @ Expos || 3–11 || Martinez || Dessens (0–1) || — || 23,736 || 35–40
|- bgcolor="ffbbbb"
| 76 || June 25 || @ Expos || 2–8 || Rueter || Smith (4–4) || Scott || 12,776 || 35–41
|- bgcolor="ccffcc"
| 77 || June 26 || @ Expos || 3–1 || Darwin (6–7) || Cormier || Cordova (10) || 12,846 || 36–41
|- bgcolor="ffbbbb"
| 78 || June 28 || @ Cardinals || 1–6 || Osborne || Neagle (8–4) || — || 34,490 || 36–42
|- bgcolor="ffbbbb"
| 79 || June 29 || @ Cardinals || 5–6 || Honeycutt || Miceli (1–4) || — || 34,426 || 36–43
|- bgcolor="ffbbbb"
| 80 || June 30 || @ Cardinals || 3–10 || Stottlemyre || Smith (4–5) || — || 38,901 || 36–44
|-

|- bgcolor="ccffcc"
| 81 || July 1 || Cubs || 4–1 || Darwin (7–7) || Navarro || Plesac (4) || 15,910 || 37–44
|- bgcolor="ffbbbb"
| 82 || July 2 || Cubs || 7–15 || Telemaco || Wagner (4–6) || — || 13,241 || 37–45
|- bgcolor="ccffcc"
| 83 || July 3 || Cubs || 3–2 || Neagle (9–4) || Castillo || Plesac (5) || 22,157 || 38–45
|- bgcolor="ffbbbb"
| 84 || July 4 || Cardinals || 1–7 || Benes || Dessens (0–2) || — || 23,321 || 38–46
|- bgcolor="ffbbbb"
| 85 || July 5 || Cardinals || 4–7 || Stottlemyre || Smith (4–6) || Fossas || 18,759 || 38–47
|- bgcolor="ffbbbb"
| 86 || July 6 || Cardinals || 5–9 || Benes || Darwin (7–8) || — || 19,144 || 38–48
|- bgcolor="ccffcc"
| 87 || July 7 || Cardinals || 8–2 || Lieber (2–2) || Morgan || — || 16,255 || 39–48
|- bgcolor="ccffcc"
| 88 || July 11 || @ Reds || 5–3 || Neagle (10–4) || Smiley || Plesac (6) || 24,670 || 40–48
|- bgcolor="ffbbbb"
| 89 || July 12 || @ Reds || 2–5 || Portugal || Darwin (7–9) || Brantley || 27,708 || 40–49
|- bgcolor="ffbbbb"
| 90 || July 13 || @ Reds || 0–3 || Jarvis || Lieber (2–3) || — || 32,119 || 40–50
|- bgcolor="ffbbbb"
| 91 || July 14 || @ Reds || 6–7 || Burba || Wagner (4–7) || Brantley || 26,619 || 40–51
|- bgcolor="ffbbbb"
| 92 || July 15 || @ Cubs || 2–12 || Castillo || Miceli (1–5) || — || 32,119 || 40–52
|- bgcolor="ccffcc"
| 93 || July 16 || @ Cubs || 10–5 || Neagle (11–4) || Navarro || — || 26,502 || 41–52
|- bgcolor="ccffcc"
| 94 || July 18 || Reds || 8–3 || Lieber (3–3) || Jarvis || — || 12,669 || 42–52
|- bgcolor="ffbbbb"
| 95 || July 19 || Reds || 3–11 || Burba || Wagner (4–8) || — || 17,153 || 42–53
|- bgcolor="ffbbbb"
| 96 || July 20 || Reds || 3–9 || Salkeld || Miceli (1–6) || — || 26,378 || 42–54
|- bgcolor="ccffcc"
| 97 || July 21 || Reds || 6–4 || Neagle (12–4) || Smiley || Plesac (7) || 23,117 || 43–54
|- bgcolor="ccffcc"
| 98 || July 23 || Expos || 5–1 || Lieber (4–3) || Martinez || — || 10,292 || 44–54
|- bgcolor="ccffcc"
| 99 || July 24 || Expos || 5–4 || Ericks (1–3) || Rojas || — || 19,219 || 45–54
|- bgcolor="ccffcc"
| 100 || July 25 || Phillies || 6–4 || Miceli (2–6) || Springer || Cordova (11) || 12,163 || 46–54
|- bgcolor="ccffcc"
| 101 || July 26 || Phillies || 7–4 || Ericks (2–3) || Bottalico || Plesac (8) || 17,239 || 47–54
|- bgcolor="ffbbbb"
| 102 || July 27 || Phillies || 1–2 || Mulholland || Parris (0–1) || — || 23,121 || 47–55
|- bgcolor="ccffcc"
| 103 || July 28 || Phillies || 12–8 || Ericks (3–3) || Borland || — || 15,189 || 48–55
|- bgcolor="ffbbbb"
| 104 || July 29 || @ Mets || 0–5 || Harnisch || Peters (0–1) || — || 15,680 || 48–56
|- bgcolor="ffbbbb"
| 105 || July 30 || @ Mets || 4–5 || Isringhausen || Cordova (2–6) || Franco || — || 48–57
|- bgcolor="ffbbbb"
| 106 || July 30 || @ Mets || 3–4 (12) || Franco || Lieber (4–4) || — || 18,378 || 48–58
|- bgcolor="ffbbbb"
| 107 || July 31 || @ Mets || 2–3 (10) || Dipoto || Plesac (3–2) || — || 15,787 || 48–59
|-

|- bgcolor="ccffcc"
| 108 || August 1 || @ Mets || 13–9 || Morel (2–0) || Mlicki || Ericks (1) || 20,327 || 49–59
|- bgcolor="ccffcc"
| 109 || August 2 || @ Phillies || 8–3 || Wilkins (2–0) || Blazier || — || 24,505 || 50–59
|- bgcolor="ffbbbb"
| 110 || August 3 || @ Phillies || 6–7 || Bottalico || Plesac (3–3) || — || 22,690 || 50–60
|- bgcolor="ffbbbb"
| 111 || August 4 || @ Phillies || 2–4 || Williams || Miceli (2–7) || Ryan || 25,498 || 50–61
|- bgcolor="ffbbbb"
| 112 || August 5 || @ Phillies || 0–3 || Schilling || Neagle (12–5) || — || 20,337 || 50–62
|- bgcolor="ffbbbb"
| 113 || August 6 || Dodgers || 1–3 || Astacio || Parris (0–2) || Worrell || 11,824 || 50–63
|- bgcolor="ccffcc"
| 114 || August 7 || Dodgers || 12–2 || Lieber (5–4) || Martinez || Wilkins (1) || 12,232 || 51–63
|- bgcolor="ffbbbb"
| 115 || August 8 || Padres || 3–12 || Sanders || Peters (0–2) || — || 8,388 || 51–64
|- bgcolor="ffbbbb"
| 116 || August 9 || Padres || 1–4 || Valenzuela || Miceli (2–8) || Hoffman || 30,066 || 51–65
|- bgcolor="ffbbbb"
| 117 || August 10 || Padres || 2–6 || Veras || Plesac (3–4) || — || 21,902 || 51–66
|- bgcolor="ffbbbb"
| 118 || August 11 || Padres || 5–7 || Bergman || Parris (0–3) || Hoffman || 27,227 || 51–67
|- bgcolor="ffbbbb"
| 119 || August 13 || Giants || 10–12 || Dewey || Plesac (3–5) || Beck || 11,378 || 51–68
|- bgcolor="ccffcc"
| 120 || August 14 || Giants || 4–3 || Peters (1–2) || Estes || Ericks (2) || 20,340 || 52–68
|- bgcolor="ffbbbb"
| 121 || August 16 || @ Braves || 4–5 || Smoltz || Neagle (12–6) || Wohlers || 39,210 || 52–69
|- bgcolor="ffbbbb"
| 122 || August 17 || @ Braves || 1–7 || Bielecki || Ruebel (1–1) || — || 49,024 || 52–70
|- bgcolor="ffbbbb"
| 123 || August 18 || @ Braves || 1–2 (14) || Borowski || Cordova (2–7) || — || 31,587 || 52–71
|- bgcolor="ffbbbb"
| 124 || August 19 || @ Astros || 1–2 (13) || Morman || Morel (2–1) || — || 15,067 || 52–72
|- bgcolor="ffbbbb"
| 125 || August 20 || @ Astros || 4–9 || Wall || Miceli (2–9) || Hernandez || 19,866 || 52–73
|- bgcolor="ccffcc"
| 126 || August 21 || @ Astros || 5–2 || Neagle (13–6) || Hampton || Ericks (3) || 13,357 || 53–73
|- bgcolor="ccffcc"
| 127 || August 22 || @ Astros || 8–6 || Wilkins (3–0) || Wagner || Ericks (4) || 14,899 || 54–73
|- bgcolor="ccffcc"
| 128 || August 23 || @ Rockies || 5–3 || Lieber (6–4) || Ritz || Cordova (12) || 48,038 || 55–73
|- bgcolor="ffbbbb"
| 129 || August 24 || @ Rockies || 3–9 || Thompson || Peters (1–3) || — || 48,014 || 55–74
|- bgcolor="ffbbbb"
| 130 || August 25 || @ Rockies || 9–13 || Munoz || Wilkins (3–1) || — || 48,139 || 55–75
|- bgcolor="ccffcc"
| 131 || August 27 || Braves || 3–2 || Neagle (14–6) || Smoltz || Plesac (9) || 14,603 || 56–75
|- bgcolor="ffbbbb"
| 132 || August 28 || Braves || 4–9 || Wade || Loaiza (0–1) || — || 14,591 || 56–76
|- bgcolor="ffbbbb"
| 133 || August 29 || Braves || 1–5 || Maddux || Lieber (6–5) || Wohlers || 12,101 || 56–77
|- bgcolor="ffbbbb"
| 134 || August 30 || Astros || 0–10 || Wall || Peters (1–4) || — || 24,619 || 56–78
|- bgcolor="ffbbbb"
| 135 || August 31 || Astros || 4–5 || Hernandez || Ericks (3–4) || Hudek || 27,559 || 56–79
|-

|- bgcolor="ccffcc"
| 136 || September 1 || Astros || 9–5 || Wainhouse (1–0) || Darwin || — || 14,144 || 57–79
|- bgcolor="ffbbbb"
| 137 || September 2 || Rockies || 3–8 || Ritz || Loaiza (0–2) || — || 9,513 || 57–80
|- bgcolor="ccffcc"
| 138 || September 4 || Rockies || 5–2 || Lieber (7–5) || Thompson || Plesac (10) || 10,081 || 58–80
|- bgcolor="ffbbbb"
| 139 || September 6 || @ Dodgers || 1–2 || Osuna || Wilkins (3–2) || Worrell || 41,509 || 58–81
|- bgcolor="ffbbbb"
| 140 || September 7 || @ Dodgers || 3–4 || Nomo || Schmidt (0–1) || Worrell || 50,862 || 58–82
|- bgcolor="ccffcc"
| 141 || September 8 || @ Dodgers || 4–1 || Plesac (4–5) || Dreifort || Ericks (5) || 33,922 || 59–82
|- bgcolor="ffbbbb"
| 142 || September 9 || @ Padres || 5–6 || Hermanson || Wilkins (3–3) || Hoffman || 15,727 || 59–83
|- bgcolor="ffbbbb"
| 143 || September 10 || @ Padres || 5–6 || Hoffman || Boever (0–1) || — || 15,694 || 59–84
|- bgcolor="ffbbbb"
| 144 || September 11 || @ Padres || 7–8 || Bochtler || Ericks (3–5) || — || 33,771 || 59–85
|- bgcolor="ccffcc"
| 145 || September 12 || @ Giants || 10–4 || Schmidt (1–1) || Dewey || Boever (1) || 8,214 || 60–85
|- bgcolor="ccffcc"
| 146 || September 13 || @ Giants || 9–0 || Loaiza (1–2) || VanLandingham || — || 9,888 || 61–85
|- bgcolor="ccffcc"
| 147 || September 14 || @ Giants || 7–5 (12) || Ericks (4–5) || Hook || Boever (2) || 15,685 || 62–85
|- bgcolor="ccffcc"
| 148 || September 15 || @ Giants || 4–1 || Lieber (8–5) || Rueter || Ruebel (1) || — || 63–85
|- bgcolor="ccffcc"
| 149 || September 15 || @ Giants || 11–9 (10) || Wilkins (4–3) || Poole || — || 21,998 || 64–85
|- bgcolor="ccffcc"
| 150 || September 17 || Reds || 5–3 || Cordova (3–7) || Smiley || Ericks (6) || 7,551 || 65–85
|- bgcolor="ccffcc"
| 151 || September 18 || Reds || 5–3 || Schmidt (2–1) || Morgan || Plesac (11) || 7,924 || 66–85
|- bgcolor="ccffcc"
| 152 || September 19 || Reds || 6–4 || Peters (2–4) || Pugh || Ericks (7) || 10,188 || 67–85
|- bgcolor="ccffcc"
| 153 || September 20 || Cubs || 6–4 || Lieber (9–5) || Foster || Ericks (8) || 19,285 || 68–85
|- bgcolor="ccffcc"
| 154 || September 21 || Cubs || 8–3 || Loiselle (1–0) || Swartzbaugh || — || 23,619 || 69–85
|- bgcolor="ccffcc"
| 155 || September 22 || Cubs || 11–3 (8) || Cordova (4–7) || Castillo || — || 27,472 || 70–85
|- bgcolor="ffbbbb"
| 156 || September 23 || Cubs || 3–4 || Trachsel || Schmidt (2–2) || Patterson || 7,684 || 70–86
|- bgcolor="ffbbbb"
| 157 || September 24 || Cardinals || 1–7 || Benes || Loaiza (1–3) || — || 8,611 || 70–87
|- bgcolor="ffbbbb"
| 158 || September 25 || Cardinals || 7–8 (11) || Bailey || Miceli (2–10) || Mathews || 20,022 || 70–88
|- bgcolor="ccffcc"
| 159 || September 27 || @ Cubs || 7–4 (10) || Plesac (5–5) || Wendell || — || — || 71–88
|- bgcolor="ffbbbb"
| 160 || September 27 || @ Cubs || 9–10 || Adams || Boever (0–2) || — || 18,757 || 71–89
|- bgcolor="ccffcc"
| 161 || September 28 || @ Cubs || 8–7 (10) || Plesac (6–5) || Wendell || — || 29,729 || 72–89
|- bgcolor="ccffcc"
| 162 || September 29 || @ Cubs || 8–3 || Loaiza (2–3) || Navarro || — || 26,873 || 73–89
|-

|-
| Legend:       = Win       = LossBold = Pirates team member

Record vs. opponents

Detailed records

Roster

Opening Day lineup

Player stats
Batting
Note: G = Games played; AB = At bats; H = Hits; Avg. = Batting average; HR = Home runs; RBI = Runs batted in

Pitching
Note: G = Games pitched; IP = Innings pitched; W = Wins; L = Losses; ERA = Earned run average; SO = Strikeouts

Awards and honors

1996 Major League Baseball All-Star Game
Jason Kendall, C, reserve

Transactions
 April 27, 1996: Joe Boever was selected off waivers by the Pirates from the Detroit Tigers.
 May 15, 1996: Jacob Brumfield was traded by the Pirates to the Toronto Blue Jays for D. J. Boston (minors).
 June 4, 1996: Kris Benson was drafted by the Pirates in the 1st round (1st pick). Player signed August 11, 1996.
 July 6, 1996: Zane Smith was released by the Pirates.
 July 23, 1996: Danny Darwin was traded by the Pirates to the Houston Astros for Rich Loiselle.
 August 28, 1996: Denny Neagle was traded by the Pirates to the Atlanta Braves for Ron Wright, Corey Pointer (minors) and a player to be named later. The Braves completed the deal by sending Jason Schmidt to the Pirates on August 30.
 August 30, 1996: Charlie Hayes was traded by the Pirates to the New York Yankees for a player to be named later. The Yankees completed the deal by sending Chris Corn (minors) to the Pirates on August 31.

Farm system

References

 1996 Pittsburgh Pirates at Baseball Reference
 1996 Pittsburgh Pirates  at Baseball Almanac

Pittsburgh Pirates seasons
Pittsburgh Pirates Season, 1996
Pittsburgh Pirates Season, 1996
Pittsburgh Pirates